India is the first studio album by Spanish singer Vega, released on 7 November 2003 on Vale Music Spain.

History
This album represents her success after having sold more than 200.000 copies of her first single "Quiero Ser Tú" (Spanish for "I Want to Be You"), which was a task to be accomplished before being entitled to a recording contract. The album itself sold more than 110.000 copies in Spain alone.

The country, India, has always been an inspiration to Vega, and that is why she decided to name her album after it. All but two songs on the album, "That's Life" (Frank Sinatra cover) and "Believe" (K's Choice cover), were written by Vega. The eighth track, "Olor A Azahar", is dedicated to the city she was born in.

The first single from India was "Grita!", which became the best-selling single of 2003 in Spain. After the success of the first single, "La Verdad (ft. Elena Gadel)" and "Directo Al Sol" followed. Elena Gadel, a member of the girl-group Lunae, whom Vega had met during the time they were part of Operación Triunfo, also helped with the background vocals for "Grita!".

Track listing
 "Directo Al Sol"
 "Mi Propio Mundo"
 "Grita!"
 "No Necesito Nada De Ti"
 "La Verdad" (ft. Elena Gadel)
 "India"
 "Believe"
 "Olor A Azahar (A Córdoba)"
 "Mijitita"
 "That's Life"
 "Un Día Normal"
 "Mi Habitación"

2003 albums
Vega (singer) albums